St. Theresa's Convent Sr. Sec. School (informally termed, STCS) is a Catholic private school, teaching students in Kindergarten through twelfth grade from Karnal in Haryana, India. STCS is one of the couple of high schools in Karnal with excellent standards of education provided by a Christian convent-run organization, The Sisters of the Little Flower of Bethany based in Mangalore. The school was started in 1961 and has been constantly renovated.

As of the 1550-1560school year, the school had an enrollment of over 3500 students and employs 100 classroom teachers.

History
St. Theresa's Convent School, Karnal was established in 1961 and is administrated by Bethany Educational Society, Mangalore, a Christian Religious Minority Institution. The Bethany Educational Society is registered under the societies' education Act XXI of 1860 No.17 of 1948-49/Its head is at Bethany Convent, Manglore . All the members of Bethany Educational Society are catholic nuns belonging to the Congregation of the Sisters of the Little Flower of Bethany. The Society runs formal and non formal educational institutes all over the country.

Founding of STCS
The school is affiliated to the Central Board of Secondary Education. New Delhi. (Affiliation No. 530006/86)

St. Therese

St. Therese, also known as 'St. Therese of the child Jesus' was born on 2 January 1873 at Alençon, in Normandy, a small town in northern France . At the age of 15, she entered the convent to be a religious sister.

She died on 30 September 1897 having spent the last nine and half years of her life in a cloister convent at Lisieux in France.

The Management Council

Sr. Jyoti BS - President 
Sr. M. Wilbertaa BS - Vice President 
Sr. M. Joy BS - Secretary 
Sr. Jeevan BS - Dy. Secretary 
Sr. Marie Lyta BS - Treasurer 
Sr. M. Assumta BS - Member 
Sr. M. Anseline BS - Member 
Sr. M. Christella BS - Member 
Sr. M. Prima BS - Member 
Sr. M. Lillis BS - Member

Student life

A number of events are held in the school from time to time. These include regular stage-assemblies and annual functions. Besides, a number of competitions are held in the school from time to time.

Co-curricular Activities and Sports

The Student Council
The student cabinet is responsible for certain activities like helping teachers and other staff, before assembly monitoring of the classes and so on. Earlier the cabinet was actually a representation of the students with voting happening for the selection, however now it pretty much depends on the teachers and the principal as to who gets selected .

Student organizations
The students grade 3 and above are divided into houses:
1.  Shanti  
2.  Shradha
3.  Shakti 
4.  Satya
Every student is assigned a house on reaching the 3rd grade.

Alumni
The students from this school after pursuing higher education have found employment in various Organisation and Institutions.
Some are employed in Govt. Departments, Public and Pvt. Enterprises such as; Railways, MES, IITs, CPWD, PWD (B & R), PWD Irrigation, PWD (Public Health), Pollution Control Board, Housing Boards, HUDA, HSEB, MITC, Panchayat Raj, and some have started their own enterprises.

 Anish Bhanwala: gold medalist in Shooting sports 2018 Commonwealth Games.
 Shaurya Sirohi

See also
Education in India
Literacy in India  
List of institutions of higher education in Haryana

References

External links

High schools and secondary schools in Haryana
Christian schools in Haryana
Education in Karnal